Johann Beer (also spelled Bähr, Baer, or Behr, Latinized as Ursus or Ursinus; (28 February 1655, in Sankt Georgen – 6 August 1700, in Weissenfels) was an Austrian author, court official and composer.

Biography
Beer was born in Austria to Protestant parents. In 1676 he entered the service of Augustus, Duke of Saxe-Weissenfels as a countertenor. In 1700 he died, aged 45, as the result of a hunting accident.

His comic writings are reminiscent of Hans Jakob Christoffel von Grimmelshausen.

His work of music theory Musikalische Discurse reveals German baroque performance practice.

Works and editions
Comic novels
 Der Simplicianische Welt-Kucker. The Simplician World-Observer 4 Vols. Halle and Saale 1677–79
 Der Abenteuerliche Ritter Hopffen-Sach. The adventurous Knight Hop-Sack. Halle 1678
 Der Politische Feuermäuer-Kehrer. Leipzig 1682
 Teutsche Winternächte. Nuremberg 1682, English translation German winter nights 1988.

Music theory
 Musikalische Discurse durch die Philosophie deducirt

Music
 Missa S. Marcellini for 8 soloists and double choir.

References

1655 births
1700 deaths
Austrian male composers
Austrian composers
Austrian male writers
Austrian music theorists
17th-century novelists
Austrian male novelists
17th-century classical composers
17th-century Austrian musicians
17th-century Austrian writers
17th-century male writers
17th-century male musicians